is a 1954 Japanese drama film directed by Keisuke Kinoshita. It is based on the novel  by Tomoji Abe.

Plot 
After the opening sequence, documenting the uprise of students at a women's boarding school following the death of one of their fellow students, the preceding events are told in a flashback narration: Among a number of young female students, opposition is growing against the conservative-authoritarian school administration and its strict doctrines. The opposing students are divided into fractions themselves, left-wing like Akiko versus unpolitical like Tomiko, and ones who call for action now versus those who urge not to act prematurely. The latter is a repeated cause for debate between Akiko, an overt socialist of upper-class descent, and Toshiko, who acts as sort of a leading figure and ideologue. Catalyst of the events is student Yoshie, who is behind in her studies, but not allowed to work late at night according to the rules. Yoshie enrolled in the school in an attempt to escape her rigid father, who also rejects her wish to marry her friend Shimoda once both have their degrees. Picked on by teacher Mayumi and suffering from social distancing by the other girls, Yoshie finally commits suicide. While she is mourned by Tomiko and Shimoda, with Tomiko, Akiko and Mayumi blaming each other for her death, the other students block the auditorium under Toshiko's guidance and sing their unofficial student's hymn which the administration had banned.

Reception 
Writers on Japanese film have noted the film's contrast between the traditional, feudalistic Japan represented by the educational establishment, and the emerging, more democratic post-war values seen in the pupils. They also commented favourably on Kinoshita's treatment of adolescent girls' emotional problems in this context. Nagisa Ōshima named The Garden of Women as the film which led to his decision to become a filmmaker himself in his 1995 documentary 100 Years of Japanese Cinema.

Awards 
The Garden of Women received the 1954 Mainichi Film Awards for Best Director, Best Screenplay, Best Supporting Actress (Yoshiko Kuga), Best Music and Best Sound Recording, as well as the Blue Ribbon Award for Best Screenplay.

Cast 
 Mieko Takamine — Mayumi Gojō, teacher
 Hideko Takamine — Yoshie Izushi
 Keiko Kishi — Tomiko Takioka
 Yoshiko Kuga — Akiko Hayashino
 Kazuko Yamamoto — Toshiko
 Takahiro Tamura — Sankichi Shimoda
 Masami Taura — Yoshikazu Sagara
 Chieko Higashiyama — President
 Kikue Mori — Dean
 Kuniko Igawa — Yoshie's sister
 Nobuo Kaneko — Kihei Hirato
 Yūko Mochizuki — Landlady
 Chieko Naniwa — Tomiko's aunt

References

External links 
 
 
 

1954 films
1954 drama films
Japanese drama films
Japanese black-and-white films
Films based on Japanese novels
Films directed by Keisuke Kinoshita
Films about educators
1950s Japanese films